Scotrun is an unincorporated community in Pocono Township in Monroe County, Pennsylvania, United States. Scotrun is located in the Pocono Mountains along Pennsylvania Route 611, north of Tannersville and south of Mount Pocono. Popular attractions in Scotrun include the Great Wolf Lodge - Pocono Mountains and the Four Seasons Campground.

References

Unincorporated communities in Monroe County, Pennsylvania
Unincorporated communities in Pennsylvania